Peder von Cappelen (24 January 1763 – 11 March 1837) was a Norwegian merchant and politician. He was involved in timber trade and owner of ironworks, and a member of the Parliament of Norway.

Personal life
Peder von Cappelen was born and raised at Mæla Manor in Gjerpen (Mæla gård i Gjerpen) in the municipality of Skien in Telemark, Norway. He was one of the sons of the wholesaler, timber merchant and ship owner Diderich von Cappelen (1734–1794) and his first wife Petronelle Pedersdatter Juel (1737–1785). He was the brother of Diderik von Cappelen and Ulrich Fredrich von Cappelen.

Career
Cappelen attended Kingswood boarding school in  Bristol, England (1780-1781).  He received a business education both abroad and at the extensive family businesses in Telemark. He settled as a wholesaler at Strømsø in Drammen during 1784. He purchased the trading facilities at Cappelengården from Peter Collett in 1784. He also acquired Austad farm through marriage. He had a seat at Eidsfos Manor (Eidsfos Hovedgård), which was his private residence. 

Cappelen acquired the Eidsfos Iron Works  at  Hof in Vestfold during  1795, and Kongsberg Iron Works on Numedalslågen in 1824.  In 1811 he donated 10,000 rigsdaler to the establishment of a University in Christiania (now University of Oslo). He represented Drammen at the Parliament of Norway from 1815. He was decorated Knight of the Order of Vasa in 1825.

Personal life
In 1784, he married  Christine Marie Klein (1766–1849). Cappelen died at Eidsfos Verk in 1837. Both of their two daughters had died before their parents. After his death, his affairs were managed by son-in-law, Jørgen von Cappelen Omsted and John Collet Bredesen.

References

1763 births
1837 deaths
Politicians from Skien
Norwegian merchants
Members of the Storting
Knights of the Order of Vasa
Peder
18th-century Norwegian businesspeople
19th-century Norwegian businesspeople